Lucas da Cruz Oliveira (born 2 February 1996),  commonly known as Lucas Oliveira or simply Oliveira, is a Brazilian footballer who plays for Cruzeiro. Mainly a central defender, he can also play as a defensive midfielder.

Honours
Atlético Goianiense
 Campeonato Goiano: 2019, 2020

References

External links
 
 

1996 births
Living people
Footballers from Rio de Janeiro (city)
Brazilian footballers
Association football defenders
Campeonato Brasileiro Série A players
Campeonato Brasileiro Série B players
Esporte Clube Tigres do Brasil players
Bangu Atlético Clube players
Atlético Clube Goianiense players
Cruzeiro Esporte Clube players